Volkswagenwerk Braunschweig is a factory site for Volkswagen automobile parts in Braunschweig (Gifhorner Str.), Germany. Production started on 1938-02-23 (before Volkswagenwerk Wolfsburg) for manufacturing steering components of „KdF-Wagen" (VW Käfer) and tools for Junkers Flugzeug- und Motorenwerke in Dessau. Until today, only components for vehicles of VW Group (Audi, Škoda, SEAT and Bugatti) are produced, such as running gears, axles, shock absorbers, brake parts and all pedals.

As of 2006, approx. 6,200 workers were employed, thus making it the largest industrial site in the city. In 2010, the number of workers amounted to 5,548. In 2014, 6625 people worked here.

Literature 
 Ulrike Gutzmann, Markus Lupa: Vom „Vorwerk“ zum FahrWerk: eine Standortgeschichte des Volkswagen Werks Braunschweig. In: Historische Notate. 13. Volkswagen AG, Wolfsburg 2008, . (Inhaltsverzeichnis PDF)
 Horst Günter: Zur Abhängigkeit der Region Braunschweig von der Volkswagen AG. In: Berichte aus der Betriebswirtschaft. Shaker, Aachen 1994, .

See also
 List of Volkswagen Group factories

References

Braunschweig
Buildings and structures in Braunschweig
Companies based in Braunschweig
1938 establishments in Germany
Economy of Nazi Germany